Hofmannsthal may refer to:

 Isaak Löw Hofmann, Edler von Hofmannsthal (1759–1849), Austrian merchant
 Augustin Emil Hofmann von Hofmannsthal (1815–1881), industrialist
 Hugo von Hofmannsthal (1874–1929), Austrian prodigy, writer, and librettist 
  (1902–1987), married Heinrich Zimmer in 1929 
 Franz von Hofmannsthal (1903–1929), committed suicide 
 Raimund von Hofmannsthal (1906–1974), married Ava Alice Muriel Astor in 1933 
 Romana von Hofmannsthal (born c. 1935), married Rory McEwen in 1958 
 Rodolphe von Hofmannsthal, married Lady Frances Armstrong-Jones the daughter of the 1st Earl of Snowdon in 2006

See also
 Hoffman, a surname (including a list of people with that name)
 Hoffmann, a surname (including a list of people with that name)
 Hofman, a surname (including a list of people with that name)